Chaoyang District is one of seven districts of the prefecture-level city of Changchun, the capital of Jilin Province, Northeast China. It borders the districts of Luyuan and Kuancheng to the north, Nanguan to the east, as well as the prefecture-level city of Siping to the south and west.

Administrative divisions
There are 11 subdistricts, two towns, and two townships.

Subdistricts:
Nanhu Subdistrict, Hongqi Subdistrict, Mengjia Subdistrict, Baiju Subdistrict, Jianshe Subdistrict, Yongchang Subdistrict, Chongqing Subdistrict, Guilin Subdistrict, Kuanping Subdistrict, Huxi Subdistrict, Qinghe Subdistrict

Towns:
Datun, Leshan

Townships:
Shuangde Township, Yongchun Township

References

External links

County-level divisions of Jilin
Changchun